The 1999 French Grand Prix  (formally the LXXXV Mobil 1 Grand Prix de France) was a Formula One motor race held on 27 June 1999 at the Circuit de Nevers Magny-Cours near Magny-Cours, France. It was the seventh race of the 1999 Formula One season. The 72-lap race was won by Heinz-Harald Frentzen driving a Jordan car after starting from fifth position. Mika Häkkinen finished second driving for McLaren, with Rubens Barrichello finishing third for the Stewart team. The remaining points-scoring positions were filled by Ralf Schumacher (Williams), Michael Schumacher (Ferrari), Eddie Irvine (Ferrari).

As a consequence of the race, Häkkinen extended his lead in the World Drivers' Championship to eight points over Schumacher, with Irvine a further 14 behind. In the World Constructors' Championship, McLaren reduced the lead over Ferrari to six points with Williams passing Benetton for fourth position, 43 points behind Ferrari.

Report

Background
Heading into the seventh round of the season, McLaren driver Mika Häkkinen was leading the World Drivers' Championship with 34 points; Ferrari driver Michael Schumacher was second on 30 points, 4 points behind Häkkinen. Behind Häkkinen and Schumacher in the Drivers' Championship, Eddie Irvine was third on 25 points in the other Ferrari, with Heinz-Harald Frentzen and Giancarlo Fisichella both on 13 points. In the Constructors' Championship, Ferrari were leading on 55 points and McLaren were second on 46 points, with Jordan third on 16 points.

Following the Canadian Grand Prix on 13 June, the teams conducted testing sessions at the Magny-Cours circuit from 16 to 18 June. David Coulthard (McLaren) set the fastest time on the first day, while Eddie Irvine was fastest on the second and final day of testing. Williams made modifications to the suspension of their cars, resulting in several spins. Among the other teams, Minardi elected to perform aerodynamic mapping work at the Automotive Safety Center using their test driver Gastón Mazzacane. Arrows performed shakedown runs at the Santa Pod Raceway.

On 16 June, Jordan driver and 1996 World Drivers' Champion Damon Hill announced that he would retire from Formula One racing at the end of the season. Hill later said a factor in his decision was the amount of testing undertaken by the teams and his own personal performance during the season, although he considered retiring with immediate effect.

Practice and qualifying
Two practice sessions were held before the Sunday race—one on Friday from 11:00 to 14:00 local time, and a second on Saturday morning between 09:00 to 11:00. The first practice session took place in dry conditions.

Saturday afternoon's qualifying session was held from 13:00 to 14:00 local time. Each driver was limited to twelve laps with the implementation of a 107% rule to exclude slow drivers from competing in the race. The session was held in wet conditions; the ambient and track temperature were both . Rubens Barrichello clinched his first pole position of the season, in his Stewart, in a time of 1:38.441. He was joined on the front row by Jean Alesi, who was four-tenths of a second behind. Olivier Panis was third in his Prost. Coulthard took fourth despite going into the gravel and spinning off late in the session. Heinz-Harald Frentzen was fifth, with Michael Schumacher completing the top six.

Due to the wet conditions, a then-record five drivers - Damon Hill, Marc Gené, Luca Badoer, Pedro de la Rosa, and Toranosuke Takagi - all failed to meet the 107% time. Hill missed out by just three milliseconds, the slimmest-ever margin. Due to the wet conditions, and the drivers' competitiveness in practice, all five drivers were permitted to race due to "exceptional circumstances".

Race 
On Sunday morning, a pre-race warm up session took place at 09:30 local time, and lasted for 30 minutes. Coulthard set the fastest lap with a time of 1:32.091. He was followed on the timesheets by Ferrari drivers Irvine and Michael Schumacher who completed the top three positions.

Rubens Barrichello managed to get away quickly to maintain first position. Jean Alesi, starting second, was slower than Barrichello and held up drivers after the start. David Coulthard was able to pass Alesi on lap two. Mika Häkkinen stormed up through the field from his starting position of fourteenth to ninth place by lap two. Häkkinen caught and passed Olivier Panis for sixth place and then caught Michael Schumacher in fifth on lap five. As this happened Herbert retired thanks to a gearbox problem. Coulthard passed Barrichello on lap six by outbraking him into the Adelaide hairpin. And then Diniz retired thanks to transmission failure on lap 7. Mika Häkkinen attempted to pass Michael Schumacher on lap nine by slipstreaming him down the long straight before the Adelaide hairpin, but was on the outside coming into Adelaide and Schumacher was able to stay just ahead. Häkkinen repeated the move on the very next lap, this time to the inside, and was able to stay in front of Schumacher. Schumacher at this point was struggling on a car that was set up for a wet race.

David Coulthard suffered a complete electrical failure (alternator failure) on lap 10 and retired, giving the lead back to Rubens Barrichello. Mika Häkkinen caught Heinz-Harald Frentzen on lap 12, then hounded him for three laps before passing him in a repeat of the move he had pulled on Michael Schumacher earlier. Frentzen tried to fight back, and was able to pull alongside Häkkinen, but Häkkinen's inside line through turn six cemented his position. Behind in the midfield Irvine overtook another car. This time it was Alexander Wurz in the Benetton. On Lap 16 Häkkinen caught up with Jean Alesi quickly, but was stuck behind him for several more laps. Häkkinen used the slipstream to pull alongside Alesi on lap 19, but they both locked up into Adelaide and only barely made the corner. Häkkinen was able to stay ahead, and began to chase down Barrichello, four and a half seconds ahead.

Rain began to fall on lap 21. Eddie Irvine pulled into the pits just as the rain started, but Ferrari was not ready for him and his pit stop took 43 seconds (42.9) after his mechanics initially put a fresh set of dry-weather tyres on his car. Well after the Irvine pit stop disaster happened Giancarlo Fisichella spun, without retiring. A scramble into the pits ensued, but the leaders were all able to hold their positions. One lap after Hill pitted he got a puncture, because he hit a wall. Jean Alesi spun out of third place on lap 25 in Chateaux d'Eau and retired, because he beached his car in the gravel. The safety car was then deployed due to the amount of water on the track. On Lap 26 Villeneuve pitted for wet tyres, and before Villeneuve pitted Zonta spun. The amount of water on the track was so great that four drivers – Jacques Villeneuve, Alexander Wurz, Marc Gené and Alessandro Zanardi – spun while following the safety car. On Lap 29 Takagi pitted for a new nose. Damon Hill retired with electrical failure while behind the safety car. The safety car came in at the end of lap 35. The restart went cleanly, with no place changes amongst the front-runners.

Mika Häkkinen made a dive-bomb attempt to pass Rubens Barrichello under braking into Adelaide on lap 38, but he put his inside wheels up onto the curbing and spun the car a full 360 degrees. Mika Häkkinen fell to seventh place. Michael Schumacher passed Heinz-Harald Frentzen through Adelaide on the next lap. Schumacher made a very late braking move to momentarily pass Barrichello into Adelaide on lap 42, but he went very wide and Barrichello cut back under Schumacher to retake the lead. Schumacher repeated the move two laps later, but this time he didn't go wide and was able to gain first place.

After 47 laps, a long train formed behind Olivier Panis in fourth, with Ralf Schumacher, Eddie Irvine, and Mika Häkkinen being held up behind him. Ralf Schumacher got past Panis on lap 50, and then Irvine came into the pits, sticking with wet tyres. Häkkinen got a good run out of Adelaide on lap 51 and passed Panis for fifth place into Nurburgring corner. On the same lap, Michael Schumacher suffered an electrical malfunction and lost most of his eight-second lead to Rubens Barrichello. He pitted three laps later, changing his steering wheel in addition to tyres. Mika Häkkinen got past Heinz-Harald Frentzen for second place on lap 57, with Frentzen running wide at Adelaide. Häkkinen passed Barrichello on lap 60 to retake the lead.

Mika Häkkinen and Rubens Barrichello pitted for extra fuel on lap 66, which let Heinz-Harald Frentzen through into the lead. During Frentzen's one and only pit stop to change onto wet tyres, the Jordan team had fortuitously filled his car with enough fuel to finish the race. Ralf Schumacher passed Michael Schumacher on lap 70, with Michael Schumacher appearing to still have car trouble. Frentzen won the race after 72 laps to secure his first victory of the season in a time of 1:58.24.343. Häkkinen held position to finish second, with Barrichello third, 43 seconds behind.

Post-race
The top three finishers appeared on the podium and in the subsequent press conference.

Damon Hill hinted after the race that this one could have been his last, or if he did compete at Silverstone in the next race he might leave Formula One afterwards.

Toranosuke Takagi was disqualified for using tyres which had been marked for his team-mate, Pedro de la Rosa.

As a consequence of the race, Häkkinen extended his lead in the World Drivers' Championship to eight points over Schumacher, with Irvine a further 14 behind. In the World Constructors' Championship, McLaren reduced the lead over Ferrari to six points with Williams passing Benetton for fourth position, 43 points behind Ferrari.

Classification

Qualifying 

1. -Due to the poor weather conditions, all cars from 18th to 22nd on the grid failed to qualify within the 107% rule. However, the stewards chose to waive the rule due to the spacing of the entire field caused by the weather problems. They were ordered in grid by free practice times, therefore Hill started 18th, de la Rosa 19th, Takagi 20th, Badoer 21st and Gené 22nd.

Race

Championship standings after the race

Drivers' Championship standings

Constructors' Championship standings

 Note:   Only the top five positions are included for both sets of standings.

References 

French Grand Prix
French Grand Prix
Grand Prix
French Grand Prix